Thomas Herbert Andrew Mason (born 20 February 1953) is an English former professional footballer who played as a midfielder in the Football League for Brighton & Hove Albion.

Life and career
Mason was born in 1953 in Buxton, Derbyshire. He began his football career with Derby County as a youngster, and turned professional in 1972. He never broke through to the league team, and signed for Brighton & Hove Albion in 1974. He made 28 appearances in his first season with the club, and was released at the end of his second. He moved into non-league football with Isthmian League clubs Horsham andafter a trial with Portsmouth came to nothingCarshalton Athletic.

References

1953 births
Living people
People from Buxton
Footballers from Derbyshire
English footballers
Association football midfielders
Derby County F.C. players
Brighton & Hove Albion F.C. players
Horsham F.C. players
Portsmouth F.C. players
Carshalton Athletic F.C. players
English Football League players
Isthmian League players